Daina Gudzinevičiūtė (born 23 December 1965, in Vilnius) is an Olympic shooting champion from Lithuania and president of National Olympic Committee, member of the International Olympic Committee.

Shooting 
Trap shooting for women was first introduced in the 2000 Summer Olympics in Sydney. Gudzinevičiūtė scored 71 hits in the qualifying round and then hit 22 out of 25 targets in the final. This was one more than Delphine Racinet's score. As the event was held in the Olympic Games for the first time, Gudzinevičiūtė also set an Olympic record. It was a very unexpected victory for Lithuania and their first medal at Sydney.

After the Sydney success it was expected that Gudzinevičiūtė would perform well in the 2004 Summer Olympics in Athens, but she scored only 55 hits and landed on the 14th place among 17 contestants. She complained about the weather with strong gusts which was an obstacle for all shooters: the best result (after the final) was just 88.

Other results:
 1988 Europe championship 1st (under the Soviet Union flag)
 1989 World championship 1st
 1992 Europe championship 2nd, 3rd
 1994 World championship 4th
 2001 Special World championship in Cairo 9th
 2002 World championship in Lahti 2nd
 2003 "Grand Prix" in Cyprus 2nd
 2004 World Cup in Athens 11th
 2005 Europe championship in Belgrade 2nd

Post shooting career 
After the Sydney games she became popular in Lithuania. She was invited to host a documentary television show "Farai" (English: cops). It follows the daily lives of Lithuanian policemen. She also worked with the State Border Guard Service.

In 2012, she beat Virgilijus Alekna in the election for the president of the National Olympic Committee of Lithuania.

In 2018 Gudzinevičiūtė become the first Lithuanian to be elected into International Olympic Committee.

References

External links
 News archive

1965 births
Living people
Soviet female sport shooters
Lithuanian female sport shooters
Olympic shooters of Lithuania
Shooters at the 1996 Summer Olympics
Shooters at the 2000 Summer Olympics
Shooters at the 2004 Summer Olympics
Shooters at the 2008 Summer Olympics
Shooters at the 2012 Summer Olympics
Olympic gold medalists for Lithuania
Trap and double trap shooters
Olympic medalists in shooting
Sportspeople from Vilnius
Medalists at the 2000 Summer Olympics
International Olympic Committee members